Bethel is an unincorporated community in Harrison Township, Delaware County, Indiana.

Bethel's other name, Stout, was named in honor of Isaac Stout, a local merchant.

Geography

References

Unincorporated communities in Delaware County, Indiana
Unincorporated communities in Indiana